Glue pot may refer to:

 a device for keeping animal glue at its working temperature
 in cricket, a sticky wicket